Majid Majeed (born 7 September 1983) is a Pakistani first-class cricketer who played for Bahawalpur cricket team.

References

External links
 

1983 births
Living people
Pakistani cricketers
Bahawalpur cricketers
People from Bahawalnagar District
Punjabi people